Kyrylo Sydorenko (born 25 July 1985) is a Ukrainian retired football defender who played for VPK-Ahro Shevchenkivka.

Club statistics
Total matches played in Moldavian First League: 20 matches - 2 goals

References

External links

1985 births
Living people
Ukrainian footballers
Association football defenders
Ukrainian expatriate footballers
Expatriate footballers in Moldova
Expatriate footballers in Belarus
Ukrainian expatriate sportspeople in Moldova
Ukrainian Premier League players
Moldovan Super Liga players
Belarusian Premier League players
FC Dnipro players
FC Dnipro-3 Dnipropetrovsk players
FC Dnipro-2 Dnipropetrovsk players
FC Tiraspol players
FC Dinamo Minsk players
FC Oleksandriya players
FC Obolon-Brovar Kyiv players
FC Arsenal Kyiv players
FC Mariupol players
FC Helios Kharkiv players
FC Desna Chernihiv players
FC VPK-Ahro Shevchenkivka players
Footballers from Dnipro